Bijar Khaleh (also Romanized as Bījār Khāleh; also known as Bidzhar-Khale) is a village in Pir Bazar Rural District, in the Central District of Rasht County, Gilan Province, Iran. At the 2006 census, its population was 280, in 75 families.

References 

Populated places in Rasht County